Wilmington High School is a public high school in Wilmington, Ohio.  It is the only high school in the Wilmington City Schools district.

Wilmington High School has been rated excellent on the state report card for the past three years.  The athletic department has had recent Ohio High School Athletic Association Division 1 individual state champions in Girls' Golf, Boys' Swimming, and Girls' Track. The Boys Basketball team were among the final four teams in the Division 1 OHSAA State basketball tournament in 2016.

In 2008, the Wilmingtones show choir—the show choir at Wilmington High School—was featured on The Rachael Ray Show. The group opened for The Fray.

Wilmington High School is home of the Wilmington Marching Band, who has received Superior ratings at the OMEA State Finals in the years 1984, 1990, 2000, 2009, 2010, 2011, 2012, 2013, and 2015. The Marching Band marched at the Magic Kingdom on New Year's Day 2014.

Notable alumni
Quinten Rollins, former NFL cornerback for the Green Bay Packers
 Mike Wilson, former NFL offensive lineman for the Cincinnati Bengals

Notes and references

External links
 District Web Site

High schools in Clinton County, Ohio
Public high schools in Ohio